Duke of Navarre was a noble title of the First French Empire.

It was created, as duchess of Navarre (duchesse de Navarre), by letters patent of 9 April 1810 for Empress Joséphine, following her divorce from Napoleon earlier that year. The title refers to her Château de Navarre in Normandy and not the former Kingdom of Navarre.

She died in 1814 and was succeeded by her grandsons, first Auguste (who died in 1835) and then Maximilian. Upon Maximilian's death in 1852, during the Second French Empire, his eldest son Nicholas was prevented from succeeding. Through his mother, Grand Duchess Maria Nikolaevna of Russia, he was a member of a foreign royal family and thus unable to take the required oath to establish succession to the majorat. The title therefore lapsed.

References

Dukes of the First French Empire
Noble titles created in 1810